The 1999 Portuguese legislative election took place on 10 October. The election renewed all 230 members of the Assembly of the Republic.

The Socialist Party was aiming a second term under the lead of António Guterres, incumbent Prime Minister, as a good economy and Portugal's growing prestige, following the Expo 1998 and the support for the East-Timor cause, were strengthening the PS position. Polls leading up to the election predicted a comfortable PS majority government. Adding to this, the main opposition party, the Social Democratic Party (PSD), was exiting an internal crisis after former leader Marcelo Rebelo de Sousa resigned in March 1999 amid disagreements with the CDS-People's Party leader, Paulo Portas, regarding a future PSD/CDS alliance for these elections. The party elected, in a snap party congress in May 1999, José Manuel Durão Barroso as new leader.

Despite opinion polls predictions, the election results were labeled as a disappointment for the Socialists as the party failed to win a historical absolute majority by just one MP and barely improved their 1995 score, just 0.3%. The disappointing PS score would create instability in Guterres second government in the years to follow. The Social Democratic Party was still away from the preferences of the majority of the Portuguese people, after the ten years cycle under the lead of Cavaco Silva that had terminated four years before, and lost 7 MPs, compared with 1995, and gathered 32% of the votes. The Democratic Unity Coalition achieved an important climb in the scorecard, against those who predicted its irreversible decline after the end of the Socialist Bloc in the early 1990s. The CDS-People's Party was able to hold on to its 15 MPs after tensions with the PSD earlier that year. For the first time, the Left Bloc, formed after the merger of several minor left-wing parties became represented in the parliament after electing two MPs.

Turnout in this election was very low, only being surpassed by all elections after 2009 when turnout stands below 60%. Overall, voter turnout was only 61% of voters, one of the lowest ever recorded.

Background

Leadership changes

PSD 1996 leadership election
After leading his party to two successive defeats, in the 1995 election and in the 1996 Presidential election, then PSD leader Fernando Nogueira resigned. A party congress to elect a new leader was called for late March 1996. For that leadership ballot, Marcelo Rebelo de Sousa announced his candidacy, just a few days after saying a phrase that would become famous in Portuguese politics, "Not even if Christ descends to earth, will I run." Marcelo faced Pedro Santana Lopes, which repeated his failed bid of 1995. Marcelo Rebelo de Sousa was easily elected as PSD leader. The results were the following:

|- style="background-color:#E9E9E9"
! align="center" colspan=2 style="width:  60px"|Candidate
! align="center" style="width:  50px"|Votes
! align="center" style="width:  50px"|%
|-
|bgcolor=orange|
| align=left | Marcelo Rebelo de Sousa
| align=right | 603
| align=right | 66.4
|-
|bgcolor=orange|
| align=left | Pedro Santana Lopes
| align=right | 305
| align=right | 33.6
|-
|- style="background-color:#E9E9E9"
| colspan=2 style="text-align:left;" |   Turnout
| align=right | 908
| align=center | 
|-
| colspan="4" align=left|Source: Results
|}

CDS–PP 1998 leadership election
Then CDS leader, Manuel Monteiro, resigned from the leadership after the party's poor results in the 1997 local elections. Paulo Portas, which had a tense relationship with Monteiro, announced his candidacy but faced the candidate of the "Monteiro wing", Maria José Nogueira Pinto. The congress was very tense, with strong accusations between both candidates, but in the end Paulo Portas was elected as new party leader:

|- style="background-color:#E9E9E9"
! align="center" colspan=2 style="width:  60px"|Candidate
! align="center" style="width:  50px"|Votes
! align="center" style="width:  50px"|%
|-
|bgcolor=|
| align=left | Paulo Portas
| align=center | WIN
| align=right | 
|-
|bgcolor=|
| align=left | Maria José Nogueira Pinto
| align=right | 
| align=right | 
|-
|- style="background-color:#E9E9E9"
| colspan=2 style="text-align:left;" |   Turnout
| align=right | 
| align=center | 
|-
| colspan="4" align=left|Source: 
|}

PSD 1999 leadership election
Then PSD leader Marcelo Rebelo de Sousa plan to creat an electoral alliance with the CDS – People's Party was splitting his party, but nonetheless, the alliance was approved in a party congress in February 1999. However, at the same a time, a scandal involving CDS–PP leader Paulo Portas, the "Moderna affair", in which corrupt deals and bad management were done in Moderna University, was creating a bad mood between PSD and CDS–PP and, specially, between the two party's leaders. In late March, Paulo Portas gives an interview on SIC that precipitated Marcelo's resignation. In that interview, Portas says that the PSD needs to come clean and say if they trust the CDS leader, and that Marcelo told him that a majority of the PSD leadership doesn't like him and feels he's a liability to the alliance. Feeling betrayed and seeing that Portas was untrustworthy, Marcelo Rebelo de Sousa resigned from the PSD leadership. A snap party congress was called for early May, and, as the sole candidate, José Manuel Durão Barroso was unanimously elected as the new PSD leader:

|- style="background-color:#E9E9E9"
! align="center" colspan=2 style="width:  60px"|Candidate
! align="center" style="width:  50px"|Votes
! align="center" style="width:  50px"|%
|-
|bgcolor=orange|
| align=left | José Manuel Durão Barroso
| align=right | 
| align=right | 100.0
|-
|- style="background-color:#E9E9E9"
| colspan=2 style="text-align:left;" |   Turnout
| align=right | 
| align=center | 
|-
| colspan="4" align=left|Source: Results
|}

Electoral system 

The Assembly of the Republic has 230 members elected to four-year terms. Governments do not require absolute majority support of the Assembly to hold office, as even if the number of opposers of government is larger than that of the supporters, the number of opposers still needs to be equal or greater than 116 (absolute majority) for both the Government's Programme to be rejected or for a motion of no confidence to be approved.

The number of seats assigned to each district depends on the district magnitude. The use of the d'Hondt method makes for a higher effective threshold than certain other allocation methods such as the Hare quota or Sainte-Laguë method, which are more generous to small parties.

For these elections, and compared with the 1995 elections, the MPs distributed by districts were the following:

Parties
The table below lists the parties represented in the Assembly of the Republic during the 7th legislature (1995–1999) and that also partook in the election:

Campaign period

Party slogans

Candidates' debates

Opinion polling 

The following table shows the opinion polls of voting intention of the Portuguese voters before the election. Those parties that are listed were represented in parliament (1995-1999). Included is also the result of the Portuguese general elections in 1995 and 1999 for reference.

Note, until 2000, the publication of opinion polls in the last week of the campaign was forbidden.

National summary of votes and seats

|-
| colspan=11| 
|-   
! rowspan="2" colspan=2 style="background-color:#E9E9E9" align=left|Parties
! rowspan="2" style="background-color:#E9E9E9" align=right|Votes
! rowspan="2" style="background-color:#E9E9E9" align=right|%
! rowspan="2" style="background-color:#E9E9E9" align=right|±
! colspan="5" style="background-color:#E9E9E9" align="center"|MPs
! rowspan="2" style="background-color:#E9E9E9;text-align:right;" |MPs %/votes %
|- style="background-color:#E9E9E9"
! style="background-color:#E9E9E9;text-align=center|1995
! style="background-color:#E9E9E9;text-align=center|1999
! style="background-color:#E9E9E9" align=right|±
! style="background-color:#E9E9E9" align=right|%
! style="background-color:#E9E9E9" align=right|±
|-
| 
|2,385,922||44.06||0.3||112||115||3||50.00||1.3||1.13
|-
| 
|1,750,158||32.32||1.8||88||81||7||35.22||3.1||1.09
|-
| 
|487,058||8.99||0.4||15||17||2||7.39||0.9||0.82
|-
| 
|451,643||8.34||0.7||15||15||0||6.52||0.0||0.78
|-
| 
|132,333||2.44||||||2||||0.87||||0.36
|-
| 
|40,006||0.74||0.0||0||0||0||0.00||0.0||0.0
|-
| 
|19,938||0.37||0.3||0||0||0||0.00||0.0||0.0
|-
| 
|16,522||0.31||||||0||||0.00||||0.0
|-
|style="width: 10px" bgcolor=#000080 align="center" | 
|align=left|National Solidarity
|11,488||0.21||0.0||0||0||0||0.00||0.0||0.0
|-
|  
|7,346||0.14||||||0||||0.00||||0.0
|-
| 
|4,104||0.08||0.1||0||0||0||0.00||0.0||0.0
|-
| 
|438||0.01||0.0||0||0||0||0.00||0.0||0.0
|-
|colspan=2 align=left style="background-color:#E9E9E9"|Total valid 
|width="65" align="right" style="background-color:#E9E9E9"|5,306,956
|width="40" align="right" style="background-color:#E9E9E9"|98.00
|width="40" align="right" style="background-color:#E9E9E9"|0.1
|width="40" align="right" style="background-color:#E9E9E9"|230
|width="40" align="right" style="background-color:#E9E9E9"|230
|width="40" align="right" style="background-color:#E9E9E9"|0
|width="40" align="right" style="background-color:#E9E9E9"|100.00
|width="40" align="right" style="background-color:#E9E9E9"|0.0
|width="40" align="right" style="background-color:#E9E9E9"|—
|-
|colspan=2|Blank ballots
|56,964||1.05||0.3||colspan=6 rowspan=4|
|-
|colspan=2|Invalid ballots
|51,230||0.95||0.1
|-
|colspan=2 align=left style="background-color:#E9E9E9"|Total
|width="65" align="right" style="background-color:#E9E9E9"|5,415,102
|width="40" align="right" style="background-color:#E9E9E9"|100.00
|width="40" align="right" style="background-color:#E9E9E9"|
|-
|colspan=2|Registered voters/turnout
||8,864,604||61.09||5.2
|-
| colspan=11 align=left | Source: Comissão Nacional de Eleições
|}

Distribution by constituency

|- class="unsortable"
!rowspan=2|Constituency!!%!!S!!%!!S!!%!!S!!%!!S!!%!!S
!rowspan=2|TotalS
|- class="unsortable" style="text-align:center;"
!colspan=2 | PS
!colspan=2 | PSD
!colspan=2 | CDU
!colspan=2 | CDS–PP
!colspan=2 | BE
|-
| style="text-align:left;" | Azores
| style="background:; color:white;"|53.3
| 3
| 35.8
| 2
| 1.7
| -
| 5.6
| -
| 1.1
| -
| 5
|-
| style="text-align:left;" | Aveiro
| style="background:; color:white;"|40.2
| 7
| 38.3
| 6
| 3.5
| -
| 13.6
| 2
| 1.3
| -
| 15
|-
| style="text-align:left;" | Beja
| style="background:; color:white;"|46.7
| 2
| 14.5
| -
| 28.3
| 1
| 3.9
| -
| 1.6
| -
| 3
|-
| style="text-align:left;" | Braga
| style="background:; color:white;"|44.3
| 8
| 36.7
| 7
| 5.4
| 1
| 8.9
| 1
| 1.2
| -
| 17
|-
| style="text-align:left;" | Bragança
| 39.7
| 2
| style="background:; color:white;"|45.1
| 2
| 2.6
| -
| 8.7
| -
| 0.8
| -
| 4
|-
| style="text-align:left;" | Castelo Branco
| style="background:; color:white;"|51.6
| 3
| 32.0
| 2
| 5.3
| -
| 6.3
| -
| 1.2
| -
| 5
|-
| style="text-align:left;" | Coimbra
| style="background:; color:white;"|47.2
| 6
| 35.2
| 4
| 6.1
| -
| 6.0
| -
| 2.0
| -
| 10
|-
| style="text-align:left;" | Évora
| style="background:; color:white;"|45.7
| 2
| 18.7
| 1
| 24.6
| 1
| 5.1
| -
| 1.5
| -
| 4
|-
| style="text-align:left;" | Faro
| style="background:; color:white;"|48.4
| 5
| 29.5
| 3
| 8.3
| -
| 7.3
| -
| 2.3
| -
| 8
|-
| style="text-align:left;" | Guarda
| style="background:; color:white;"|43.4
| 2
| 39.2
| 2
| 3.2
| -
| 9.8
| -
| 1.1
| -
| 4
|-
| style="text-align:left;" | Leiria
| 36.8
| 4
| style="background:; color:white;"|42.6
| 5
| 5.3
| -
| 9.9
| 1
| 1.7
| -
| 10
|-
| style="text-align:left;" | Lisbon
| style="background:; color:white;"|42.7
| 23
| 27.3
| 14
| 12.3
| 6
| 8.5
| 4
| 4.9
| 2
| 49
|-
| style="text-align:left;" | Madeira
| 35.1
| 2
| style="background:; color:white;"|46.2
| 3
| 2.8
| -
| 10.9
| -
| 1.2
| -
| 5
|-
| style="text-align:left;" | Portalegre
| style="background:; color:white;"|51.2
| 2
| 22.5
| 1
| 15.0
| -
| 5.9
| -
| 1.2
| -
| 3
|-
| style="text-align:left;" | Porto
| style="background:; color:white;"|48.0
| 19
| 32.7
| 13
| 6.2
| 2
| 7.5
| 3
| 2.3
| -
| 37
|-
| style="text-align:left;" | Santarém
| style="background:; color:white;"|45.5
| 5
| 30.2
| 3
| 10.1
| 1
| 8.1
| 1
| 2.0
| -
| 10
|-
| style="text-align:left;" | Setúbal
| style="background:; color:white;"|43.7
| 8
| 18.0
| 3
| 24.8
| 5
| 5.6
| 1
| 3.5
| -
| 17
|-
| style="text-align:left;" | Viana do Castelo
| style="background:; color:white;"|40.2
| 3
| 35.8
| 2
| 5.0
| -
| 14.0
| 1
| 1.2
| -
| 6
|-
| style="text-align:left;" | Vila Real
| 40.8
| 2
| style="background:; color:white;"|45.5
| 3
| 2.4
| -
| 6.8
| -
| 0.8
| -
| 5
|-
| style="text-align:left;" | Viseu
| 38.1
| 4
| style="background:; color:white;"|44.3
| 4
| 2.2
| -
| 10.5
| 1
| 1.2
| -
| 9
|-
| style="text-align:left;" | Europe
| style="background:; color:white;"|55.4
| 2
| 24.7
| -
| 5.3
| -
| 3.2
| -
| 0.6
| -
| 2
|-
| style="text-align:left;" | Outside Europe 
| 39.8
| 1
| style="background:; color:white;"|49.5
| 1
| 1.7
| -
| 3.5
| -
| 0.4
| -
| 2
|-
|- class="unsortable" style="background:#E9E9E9"
| style="text-align:left;" | Total
| style="background:; color:white;"|44.1
| 115
| 32.3
| 81
| 9.0
| 17
| 8.3
| 15
| 2.4
| 2
| 230
|-
| colspan=12 style="text-align:left;" | Source: Comissão Nacional de Eleições
|}

Maps

Notes

References

External links 
Preliminary results of the 1999 election
Comissão Nacional de Eleições 
Centro de Estudos do Pensamento Político

See also

Politics of Portugal
List of political parties in Portugal
Elections in Portugal

Legislative elections in Portugal
1999 elections in Portugal
October 1999 events in Europe